Anthony Paul Doyle  (born 19 May 1958) is a British former professional cyclist.

Biography

Doyle was world pursuit champion in 1980 and 1986. He was a professional between 1980 and 1995, riding for British teams.

Doyle represented England and won two bronze medals in the 4,000 metres individual and team pursuit events, at the 1978 Commonwealth Games in Edmonton, Alberta, Canada.

He finished seventh in the team pursuit at the 1980 Summer Olympics in Moscow as part of the British team. He was not selected for the individual pursuit even though he was the national champion. The place went to Sean Yates. As a result, Doyle turned professional and won the world professional pursuit championship, beating Bert Oosterbosch and Herman Ponsteen. He then raced six-day track races with a variety of partners before achieving great results partnering the Australian Danny Clark.

Doyle became a regular in six-day track races during the 1980s, winning 23 six days. As a result, he was and still is Britain's most successful six day rider. He was noted for fluid and rapid pedalling, which brought him an unofficial UK time-trial record for 25 miles on a 72-inch gear in 56m 30s.

In 1989 Tony Doyle suffered from a serious head injury and multiple fractures at the Munich Six day. He was given the last rites and was in a coma for ten days. He spent six weeks in ITU, followed by two months in a rehabilitation centre. Due to the extent of his injuries it was predicted that he would be unable to return to professional racing.

Doyle received the Bidlake Memorial Prize in 1980 following his first world championship. He received an MBE for services to cycling in 1989.

He took silver in the team pursuit at the 1994 Commonwealth Games in Victoria, British Columbia, Canada.

Unfortunately, a broken back as a result of a crash at the Six Day in Zurich ended his professional career. After, he remained in sport and in particular cycling. Doyle was elected President of British Cycling in late 1995 on a platform of increasing transparency and accountability. However, British Cycling's board attempted to remove him shortly afterwards: two weeks after this, he resigned. He was the founder director of the Tour of Britain which restarted in 1994. In 2009, he was inducted into the British Cycling Hall of Fame. Tony Doyle is currently Chairman of the Olympic Delivery Board for the London Borough of Southwark.

His son George, was born in 1992. Daughter Gemma, was born in 1995 and his youngest son James was born in 1999.

Major results

Track

1978
 Commonwealth Games
3rd  Individual pursuit
3rd  Team pursuit
1980
 1st  Individual pursuit, UCI Track World Championships
1981
 1st  Individual pursuit, National Track Championships
1983
 1st Six Days of Berlin (with Danny Clark)
 1st Six Days of Dortmund (with Danny Clark)
1984
 1st  Madison (with Gary Wiggins), European Track Championships
 2nd  Individual pursuit, UCI Track World Championships
1985
 1st Six Days of Bremen (with Gary Wiggins)
 1st Six Days of Maastricht (with Danny Clark)
 2nd  Individual pursuit, UCI Track World Championships
 2nd  Madison (with Gary Wiggins), European Track Championships 
1986
 1st  Individual pursuit, UCI Track World Championships
 1st Six Days of Ghent (with Danny Clark)
 1st Six Days of Berlin (with Danny Clark)
 1st Six Days of Dortmund (with Danny Clark)
 1st Six Days of Grenoble (with Francesco Moser)
1987
 UCI Track World Championships
2nd  Points race
3rd  Individual pursuit
 1st Six Days of Maastricht (with Danny Clark)
 1st Six Days of Copenhagen (with Danny Clark)
 1st Six Days of Bremen (with Danny Clark)
 1st Six Days of Paris (with Danny Clark)
 1st Six Days of Bassano Del Grappa (with Moreno Argentin)
1988
 1st Six Days of Munster (with Danny Clark)
 1st Six Days of Berlin (with Danny Clark)
 1st Six Days of Dortmund (with Danny Clark)
 1st Six Days of Munich (with Danny Clark)
 1st Six Days of Launceston (with Danny Clark)
 1st Six Days of Copenhagen (with Danny Clark)
 1st Six Days of Rotterdam (with Danny Clark)
 2nd  Individual pursuit, UCI Track World Championships
1989
 1st Six Days of Cologne (with Danny Clark)
1990
 1st Six Days of Munich (with Danny Clark)
1991
 1st Six Days of Ghent (with Etienne De Wilde)
1994
 2nd  Team pursuit, Commonwealth Games

Road

1976
 2nd National junior road race series
1977
1st Manchester–Rhyl Stage Race
1979
 2nd Overall Circuit des Ardennes
 1st 13 times in French Road Races
1980
 1st 4 times in French Road Races
1981
 1st Overall Girvan Three Day
1982
 1st Overall Girvan Three Day
1983
 1st Kelloggs Nottingham City Centre
 1st Stage 5 Sealink International
1984
 2nd Overall Sealink International
1st Stage 3
1986
 1st Overall Ron Kitching Classic
1st Stage 1
 1st Stage 5 Sealink International
 1st Kelloggs Westminster City Centre
1989
 1st Stage 8 Milk Race
1992
 3rd Tom Simpson Memorial RR
1993
 1st Stage 3 Rás Tailteann
1994
 1st Victor Belmont Road Race

References

External links
Interview with Tony Doyle, Cycling News, 8 September 2004
BBC Interview with Tony Doyle, 2 September 2006 (Video)

1958 births
Living people
English male cyclists
Members of the Order of the British Empire
UCI Track Cycling World Champions (men)
People from Ashford, Surrey
Olympic cyclists of Great Britain
Cyclists at the 1980 Summer Olympics
Commonwealth Games medallists in cycling
Commonwealth Games silver medallists for England
Commonwealth Games bronze medallists for England
English track cyclists
Cyclists at the 1978 Commonwealth Games
Cyclists at the 1994 Commonwealth Games
English sports executives and administrators
Medallists at the 1978 Commonwealth Games
Medallists at the 1994 Commonwealth Games